Kalikula may refer to:

 Kalikula, a Kali worshiping sect of Hinduism
 Kaliküla, a village in Estonia